Viktor Vyacheslavovich Kovalenko (born 6 December 1991) is an Uzbekistani ice dancer who competes with Elizaveta Tretiakova. With former partner Anna Nagornyuk, he placed 10th at the 2013 World Junior Championships.

Career 
Early in his career, Viktor Kovalenko competed with Maria Popkova. They placed 24th at the 2010 World Junior Championships.

Kovalenko began competing internationally with Anna Nagornyuk in the 2011–2012 season, appearing on both the junior and senior levels. They competed on the 2011–12 ISU Junior Grand Prix series and then made their senior international debut at the 2012 Four Continents where they placed 8th. Nagornyuk and Kovalenko finished 12th at the 2012 World Junior Championships and were entered to compete on the senior level at the 2012 World Championships. Although Nagornyuk was granted her visa a week before the competition, Kovalenko received his on the morning of 26 March, the same day they were scheduled to compete in the preliminary round. They arrived in Nice, France, half an hour before they were due to compete and reached the arena ten minutes before competing, but were able to qualify for the short dance.

In the 2012–13 season, Nagornyuk and Kovalenko placed 10th at both the Four Continents Championships and World Junior Championships. They parted ways at the end of the season.

Ahead of the 2013–14 season, Kovalenko teamed up with Elizaveta Tretiakova. They withdrew from the 2013 Nebelhorn Trophy, a qualifier for the 2014 Winter Olympics, because he developed chicken pox just before the event.

Programs

With Tretiakova

With Nagornyuk

With Popkova

Competitive highlights

With Tretiakova

With Nagornyuk

With Popkova

References

External links 

 
 
 Viola Zakhliupana / Viktor Kovalenko 
 

Uzbekistani male ice dancers
1991 births
Living people
Sportspeople from Tashkent
Dancers from Tashkent